Chlorodontopera is a monotypic moth genus in the family Geometridae described by Warren in 1893. Its only species, Chlorodontopera chalybeata, described by Frederic Moore in 1872, is found in the north-eastern Himalayas, northern Vietnam, Myanmar, Borneo and Sumatra.

Description
Palpi oblique, second joint thickly scaled and reaching beyond the frons. Abdomen with dorsal tufts. Wings with outer margin crenulate (scalloped). Forewings with veins 7, 8, 9 and 10 stalked. Vein 11 anastomosing (fusing) with vein 12, and then with vein 10. Hindwings with produced margin to points at vein 4 and usually at vein 6.

References

 

Geometrinae
Monotypic moth genera